Ayoub Rachane (born 12 July 1988) is a Moroccan footballer who last plays for Yverdon-Sport FC.

External links
http://www.football.ch/sfl/777843/de/Kader.aspx?tId=0&pId=754092

1988 births
Living people
Footballers from Casablanca
Moroccan footballers
Moroccan expatriate footballers
FC Luzern players
Yverdon-Sport FC players
Swiss Super League players
Expatriate footballers in Switzerland
Moroccan expatriate sportspeople in Switzerland
Association football midfielders